Santiago García (born 8 July 1988) is an Argentine professional footballer who plays as a left-back for Club Alianza Lima.

Club career

Rosario Central
García started his career at hometown club Rosario Central, playing his first game with the team on a 0–1 defeat to Gimnasia y Esgrima La Plata during the 2008 Apertura tournament. He broke into the starting eleven during the 2010 Clausura tournament under the guidance of head coach Ariel Cuffaro Russo, relegating Ecuadorian international Paúl Ambrosi to the bench. García made a total 13 positive appearances which led to interest from a number of European clubs.

Palermo and loan to Novara
On 12 July 2010, Palermo chairman and owner Maurizio Zamparini confirmed the signing of the Argentine defender from Rosario Central. He debuted with the rosanero on 30 September against Lausanne in the UEFA Europa League.

On 19 July 2011, newly promoted Serie A club Novara confirmed on its website to have signed García on loan from Palermo, with an option to acquire half of the player's rights by the end of the season. He scored his first goal in the Serie A on 13 May 2012 against Milan.

In the 2012–13 season, he returned to Palermo to replace Federico Balzaretti, who moved to Roma. In his second full season at the rosanero, he suffered relegation to Serie B and was often criticized by the team supporters due to the alleged poor quality of his performances.

In July 2013, García did not answer to the pre-season call-up from Palermo, his agent stating his intention not to play for the Sicilians anymore.

Werder Bremen
On 1 September 2013, Palermo announced to have loaned García to Werder Bremen with an option to sign him permanently. In October 2013, Werder Bremen expressed their interest in turning the loan into a permanent deal.

In May 2017, Werder Bremen announced that García would leave the club at the end of the season after they had failed to agree a contract extension. In his four years at the club, he made a total of 99 appearances across all competitions, scoring 5 goals and contributing 10 assists.

Toluca
In June 2017, García joined Liga MX club Toluca.

Alianza Lima
In December 2023 it was announced that García would join Club Alianza Lima for the 2023 season, having trialled with the club in pre-season.

Personal life
García also holds Spanish citizenship. His twin brother, Manuel, is also a professional footballer.

Career statistics

References

1988 births
Living people
Argentine footballers
Footballers from Rosario, Santa Fe
Association football central defenders
Rosario Central footballers
Palermo F.C. players
Novara F.C. players
SV Werder Bremen players
Deportivo Toluca F.C. players
Unión La Calera footballers
Club Alianza Lima footballers
Argentine Primera División players
Serie A players
Bundesliga players
3. Liga players
Liga MX players
Chilean Primera División players
Argentine expatriate footballers
Argentine expatriate sportspeople in Chile
Expatriate footballers in Chile
Argentine expatriate sportspeople in Mexico
Expatriate footballers in Mexico
Argentine expatriate sportspeople in Italy
Expatriate footballers in Italy
Argentine expatriate sportspeople in Germany
Expatriate footballers in Germany
Argentine expatriate sportspeople in Peru
Expatriate footballers in Peru